Yaonáhuac is the municipal seat of Yaonáhuac Municipality, in the Mexican state of Puebla.

Nomenclature
Two translations exist for "Yaonáhuac":
It may come from huey, "great"; atl "water"; ohtli, and náhuac, "way" and via "together, close". Hence "next to the great waterway".
Or it may come from yau, "to go" or "to walk" and náhuac, "together", "they go together", referring to two small rivers that are united later to form the Puxtla river.

Populated places in Puebla